Mano Thangaraj is an Indian Tamil politician from the Dravida Munnetra Kazhagam (DMK). Since May 2016, he has been representing Padmanabhapuram constituency in the Tamil Nadu Legislative Assembly. He is also the incumbent Minister of Information Technology and Digital Services Department of Tamil Nadu.

Early life 
He was born on 1 June 1967 to Thangaraj from Karungal in Kanyakumari district.

Education 
Mano Thangaraj studied at Nesamony Memorial Christian College (NMCC) (in Marthandam, Kanyakumari), where he was the students union chairman. This period marked his interest in politics.

He obtained an MA in English literature from Annamalai University in May 1997.

Activism 
In 1988, he protested against drawing water from the Pechiparai Reservoir for the Koodankulam Nuclear Power Plant (KKNPP).

Politics

Civic Body Member (1996-2006) 
He served as the district panchayat chairman from 1996 to 2006.

Member of Legislative Assembly (2016-)

Ministership (2021-)

GITEX 2022 
He participated in GITEX 2022 at Dubai as a representative of Ministry for Information Technology & Digital Services. India for Government of Tamil Nadu. He met lot of founders, CEOs, top leadership of Indian Startups at GITEX, Dubai, during “Meet Indian Startups” event organised by the Consulate General of India, Dubai On 12 Oct 2022 .

Philanthropy 
He owns the Good Vision Charitable Trust which was working on women, children and sanitation related issues.

References 

1967 births
Living people
People from Kanyakumari district
Indian Tamil people
Dravida Munnetra Kazhagam politicians
Tamil Nadu MLAs 2016–2021
Tamil Nadu MLAs 2021–2026
Tamil Nadu ministers